Hein Otterspeer (born 11 November 1988) is a Dutch speed skater who specialises in the sprint distances.

Career 
Otterspeer finished second in the 2014 Dutch sprint championships, held at the Olympisch Stadium in Amsterdam. In January 2015, he became the Dutch sprint champion in Groningen. He finished second at the 2015 World Sprint Speed Skating Championships in Astana, Kazakhstan, behind Pavel Kulizhnikov.

From 2011 through 2014, he was a member of Team Beslist; since 2015, Otterspeer has been a member of Team LottoNL-Jumbo.

Personal records

Source: SpeedskatingResults.com

Tournament overview

Source:

World Cup overview

Source:

 GWC = Grand World Cup
 – = Did not participate
 DQ = Disqualified
 (b) = World Cup division B
 DNF = Did not finish

References

External links
 
 
 
 Team LottoNL-Jumbo profile

1988 births
Living people
Dutch male speed skaters
Sportspeople from Gouda, South Holland
World Sprint Speed Skating Championships medalists
Olympic speed skaters of the Netherlands
Speed skaters at the 2022 Winter Olympics
21st-century Dutch people